Nuphar pumila, the least water-lily or small yellow pond-lily, is an aquatic perennial plant in the Nymphaeaceae family.  It is also known as the dwarf water lily since it looks like a smaller Nuphar lutea. while Nuphar pumila has a star-shaped, or lobed form of the stigma disc and glabrous leaf undersides, Nuphar lutea has a round stigma disc and the undersides of its leaves are occasionally fine-haired on the midribs. Its flowers bloom from July to August and are typically pollinated by flies.

The plant is more successful in sunny environments, predominantly in lakes, ponds and slow-flowing parts of rivers from Northern and Central Europe to Northern Asia, with a few noted habitats in North America; Nuphar pumila is considered endangered in France, Switzerland and the United Kingdom.

Description 
Nuphar pumila flowers typically have 4–6 petals, are actinomorphic, have many stamen and range from yellow to green depending on maturity. Its floating leaves are large and ovate, with pinnate venation, while the submerged leaves are smaller and round; the plant also has a thick creeping rhizome.

Distribution 
Nuphar pumila can be found in western Mongolia, Austria, Switzerland, Czech Republic, Germany, Spain, Denmark, Finland, Lithuania, Latvia, Norway, Poland, Sweden, UK and France.

Nuphar pumila can also be found in the United States (at least Michigan's upper peninsula).

Taxonomy 
The Nymphaeaceae family, also known as the water-lily family, comprises eight genera and 70 species; taxonomic synonyms include Nuphar lutea subsp. pumila, Nuphar microphylla, and Nuphar minima.

Nuphar pumila is also known as Bwlyts Lleiaf in Welsh, Konnanulpukka in Finnish, Kleine Teichrose in German, "Бяцхан сахуу цэцэг" in Mongolian and Stulík malý in Czech.

Uses 
The root can be consumed to help alleviate digestive problems or serve as a tonic.

References 

Nymphaeaceae